is a Japanese professional footballer who plays as a midfielder for Fujieda MYFC.

Career
Mizuno moved up to Nagoya Grampus' first team from the youth team in January 2012. On 10 April 2013, Mizuno joined FC Gifu on loan. He made his debut on 28 April 2013, coming on as a 76th-minute substitute in his side's 1-1 draw with Montedio Yamagata.

Club statistics
Updated to 23 February 2018.

References

External links
Profile at Fujieda MYFC 
Profile at FC Gifu

1993 births
Living people
People from Inuyama, Aichi
Association football people from Aichi Prefecture
Japanese footballers
J1 League players
J2 League players
J3 League players
Nagoya Grampus players
FC Gifu players
Fujieda MYFC players
J.League U-22 Selection players
Association football midfielders
Roasso Kumamoto players